The 1920–21 season was Newport County's first season in the Football League. They were founder members of the new Football League Third Division.

Season review

Results summary

Results by round

Fixtures and results

Third Division

FA Cup

Welsh Cup

League table

Pld = Matches played; W = Matches won; D = Matches drawn; L = Matches lost; F = Goals for; A = Goals against;GA = Goal average; GD = Goal difference; Pts = Points

External links
 Newport County 1920–1921 : Results
 Newport County football club match record: 1921
 Welsh Cup 1920/21

References

 Amber in the Blood: A History of Newport County. 

1920–21
English football clubs 1920–21 season
1920–21 in Welsh football